Buston (formerly Chkalovsk or Chkalov) is a town in northern Tajikistan. It is located in Sughd Region, between the cities of Khujand and Ghafurov. Buston is a city of regional subordination, and is not part of a district.

The population of Buston in 2020 is estimated at 34,000 for the city proper and 36,900 for the city with the outlying communities. The city of Guliston also covers the town Palos.

As a result of its involvement in the processing of uranium ore mined nearby, Chkalovsk was a closed city until the collapse of the USSR. The first Soviet uranium processing plant, Leninabad Mining and Chemical Combine was founded in Chkalovsk during 1940s.

Khujand Airport is located in the town.

The Presidential National Guard of Tajikistan formed one of its new units here.

On February 1, 2016, the Government of Tajikistan decided to rename Chkalovsk into Buston (Бӯстон). According to TASS news agency, it was the last town in Tajikistan with a Russian name.

See also
List of cities in Tajikistan

References

Populated places in Sughd Region